Poul Sørensen (born 23 April 1954) is a former Danish handball player who competed in the 1984 Summer Olympics.

He played his club handball with Rødovre HK. In 1984 he finished fourth with the Denmark men's national handball team in the Olympic tournament. He played all six matches as goalkeeper.

References

1954 births
Living people
Danish male handball players
Olympic handball players of Denmark
Handball players at the 1984 Summer Olympics